Ahmed Hussain A. Kazi Tamgha-e-Pakistan (Medal of Pakistan) Award (15 August 1920 – 7 January 2007) was a civil servant of Pakistan and senior advocate of the Pakistan Supreme Court, who shaped the internal revenue, economic and industrialization policies during the 1970s.

Family and Education
Kazi was born in Hyderabad, Sindh then part of the Bombay Presidency of British India on 15 August 1920. He finished his basic education (Matriculation examination) in 1936 and secured the Sir Jairajbhoy Peerbhoy scholarship of the University of Bombay for securing first position amongst the Muslim candidates. In 1938, Kazi annexed the Sir Frank Souter scholarship in his intermediate examinations. In 1940, he received a degree in Mathematics and English language. In 1942, Kazi graduated a second time with a LL.B degree in Law and Justice from the Bombay University.

His ancestors belonged to Paat village in Dadu District and he was the only surviving child of Dr Ali Ahmed S Kazi, one of the few Muslim physicians from Sindh at the time, who founded the Liaquat Medical School, Hyderabad (now the Liaquat University of Medical and Health Sciences), was the first Medical Superintendent of Civil Hospital, Karachi and subsequently Director Health Services, Government of Sindh.

He was a grand nephew of Allama I. I. Kazi, a Muslim scholar and philosopher, and his German wife Elsa Kazi. He married his cousin Ayesha daughter of renowned educationist Khan Bahadur Ghulam Nabi Kazi MBE in 1946.

Career
Kazi received his law degree and then enrolled as an Advocate of the Chief Court now High Court of Sindh, he joined government service after competing the Indian Audits and Accounts Service and Allied Services examination of 1944 in British India. During his initial posting as Income Tax Officer, Bombay in 1945, he worked under John Burt Shearer a senior Indian Civil Service officer working as Commissioner Income Tax, Bombay. He later decided to move to and serve in Pakistan after independence of Pakistan in 1947 and held senior positions such as Commissioner of Income Tax in the cities of Karachi, Lahore and in the province of Balochistan, Member Central Board of Revenue now called Federal Board of Revenue (Pakistan), and Finance Director Pakistan Steel Mills Corporation. In the revenue work done by him, he had intensive training in commercial accounts in all types of businesses, commerce and industry giving him the necessary background for industrial management and development.

Ahmed Hussain a Kazi was promoted as Secretary to the Government of Pakistan (the highest rung in the civil service) and held the office of Chairman Pakistan Industrial Development Corporation, the largest industrial conglomerate at that time, from 1974-1978. During this period, he was also Chairman of all the gas companies of Pakistan including Sui Gas Transmission company, Indus Gas Company, Karachi Gas Company and Sui Northern Gas Pipelines. He also remained Chairman, Pakistan Institute of Management. Some of the PIDC projects he headed included Harnai Woolen Mills, Talpur Textile Mills, Liquified Petroleum Gas project in Quetta and Larkana, Timber Seasoning Plant, PIDC Printing Press, Director, Forest Industries Complex, Harnai Woolen Mills, Mineral Development Program in Balochistan, Specialized Refractory Plant, Sor Range Coal Mines, Rock Salt Mines in Khewra, Punjab and several other sites, Coal Briquetting Plant, Quetta, Timber Preservation and Seasoning Plant, Qaidabad Woolen Mills, General Refractories, Indus Steel Pipes, Haripur Rosin and Turpentine, Shahdadkot Textile Mills, Bawany Sugar Mills, Larkana Sugar Mills and Bannu Sugar Mills. He was also the first Managing Director of the National Fertilizer Corporation and Pakistan-Iran Textiles and served on the board of directors of the Maple Leaf Cement Factory, White Cement Industries, Khurram Chemicals, Lyallpur Chemicals and Fertilizers, Pak-American Fertilizers, Makerwal Collieries, Crescent Jute Products, Zeal Pak Cement, Pak Arab Fertilizers.

Post retirement activity

After his retirement in 1979, he practiced as an advocate of the Supreme Court of Pakistan until his appointment as Chairman adhoc Public Accounts Committee Sindh. He held the latter position until the induction of the Provincial Assembly of Sindh in 1985. He was awarded the civil award of Tamgha-e-Pakistan at an early point in his career in recognition of his loyalty and integrity to Pakistan by the then President of Pakistan Yahya Khan.

Death
Kazi died on 7 January 2007 at the age of 86, and was survived by a widow Mrs Ayesha Kazi, daughter Dr Nilofer Qureshi a Professor of Basic Medical Sciences at the University of Missouri–Kansas City, and two sons Safdar Kazi, Senior Vice President Sindh Bank Limited and Dr Ghulam Nabi Kazi, National Professional Officer of the World Health Organization Pakistan. His grand children include Arif Qureshi, Sonya Kazi, Ali Ahmed Kazi, Asad Kazi and Elsa Kazi Jr. He has also left behind two great grand children Ari and Zoe Qureshi.

See also
 Allama I. I. Kazi
 Elsa Kazi
 Dr Ali Ahmed S Kazi
 Khan Bahadur Ghulam Nabi Kazi
 A G N Kazi
 Justice Mushtak Ali Kazi
 Justice Bashir Ghulam Nabi Kazi
 Ghulam Nabi Kazi
 List of Pakistanis
 List of Sindhi people
 Sindh
 Paat
 University of Mumbai
 Pakistan Industrial Development Corporation
 High Court of Sindh
 Supreme Court of Pakistan
 Federal Board of Revenue (Pakistan)
 Sui Northern Gas Pipelines
 Pakistan Steel Mills
 Provincial Assembly of Sindh
 Indian Audits and Accounts Service

References

1920 births
2007 deaths
Pakistani Muslims
Sindhi people
Pakistani civil servants